"Amanecer" ("") is a song performed by Spanish singer Edurne. It was chosen by public broadcaster Televisión Española to represent Spain in the Eurovision Song Contest 2015 in Vienna, where it placed 21st with 15 points. The song was written by Tony Sánchez-Ohlsson, Peter Boström and Thomas G:son. It premiered on 1 March 2015, and it was released as a single on digital platforms on 2 March 2015.

The song was the lead single of Edurne's sixth studio album, Adrenalina. It was also the official song of the 2015 Vuelta a España.

Background and composition
The song, described as "a midtempo with a certain degree of drama and ethnic character", was written by Spanish songwriter Tony Sánchez-Ohlsson and Swedish songwriters Peter Boström and Thomas G:son. It was presented to Edurne in October 2014 during the selection of songs for her sixth studio album. In November 2014, Edurne and record label Sony Music Spain decided to place a bid to represent Spain in the Eurovision Song Contest 2015 and presented the song to public broadcaster TVE.  On 14 January 2015, TVE announced that they had internally selected Edurne as the Spanish Eurovision entrant in 2015 with "Amanecer".

The single was produced in Spain and Sweden. The string section of the RTVE Symphony Orchestra, under the direction of  Pepe Herrero, recorded the string arrangements for the track.

On 3 March 2015, Edurne, the RTVE Symphony Orchestra and the RTVE Choir, once again under the direction of Pepe Herrero, recorded the symphonic version of the song at the Teatro Monumental in Madrid.

Live performances
Edurne performed the song live for the first time on late night talk show Alaska y Segura, aired on La 1 on 6 April 2015. On 11 April 2015, Edurne performed the song live on La 1's variety show La Alfombra Roja Palace.

On 23 May 2015 Edurne performed the song live during the final of the Eurovision Song Contest 2015 at the Wiener Stadthalle in Vienna, Austria. She was accompanied on stage by Italian dancer Giuseppe Di Bella. At the end of the voting, it had received 15 points, placing 21st in a field of 27 songs.

Music video
The official video of the song premiered on 9 March 2015. It was filmed in studio in Valencia in January 2015, directed by David Arnal and Germán de la Hoz, and features visual effects by Virtual Art. Edurne is accompanied in the video by model Saoro Nadal.

Track listing

Chart performance

Weekly charts

Release history

References

Eurovision songs of Spain
Eurovision songs of 2015
2015 songs
2015 singles
Songs written by Thomas G:son
Songs written by Peter Boström
Sony Music singles
Songs written by Tony Sánchez-Ohlsson